Vilborg Dagbjartsdóttir (18 July 1930 – 16 September 2021) was an Icelandic writer, poet and teacher. She published her first book of poetry in 1960 and became one of the few women in Iceland to write modernist poetry. Her third book of poems, Kyndilmessa (1971; Candlemass), has been described as a "breakthrough". Innovative features in her works include the use of colloquial language and images of daily life. Like Jón úr Vör she combined lyrical realism with romantic imagery. Vilborg was active in the feminist movement, and her works are concerned with the status of women in society as well as social inequality in general. She published a number of books for children, including non-fiction works and translations.

Early life
Vilborg was born in Vestdalseyri, Seyðisfjörður in the Eastern Region of Iceland. She studied to become a teacher, and became one in 1955. She taught at elementary school all together for 46 years.

Political views
In regard to her political views, media has written that "she converted to communism before she was eighteen and went to Reykjavik to study"; she was also described as a "socialist".

Personal life
Vilborg was married to Þorgeir Þorgeirson (1933–2003), a writer and filmmaker.

Death
Vilborg died on 16 September 2021 at the National University Hospital of Iceland.

Works
Poetry
 Laufið á trjánum ('foliage on the trees'), Heimskringla 1960
 Dvergliljur ('dwarf lilies'), Helgafell 1968
 Kyndilmessa (Candlemas), Helgafell 1971
 Ljóð (heildarútgáfa) (Poems), Mál og menning 1981
 Klukkan í turninum (The Clock in the Tower), Forlagið 1992
 Ótta (ljóðaúrval), Valdimar Tómasson 1994
 Ljósar hendur (safnrit 3 skálda),  Fjölvaútgáfan 1996
 Orðin vaxa í kringum mig (1989; Words Grow All Around Me)

Notes

References
 Bandle, Oskar et al. (2002). The Nordic Languages: an International Handbook of the History of the North Germanic Languages. Walter de Gruyter. 
 Neijmann, Daisy L. (2007). A History of Icelandic Literature. University of Nebraska Press.  
 Tierney, Helen (1999). Women's Studies Encyclopedia. Greenwood Press. 
 Vilborg Dagbjartsdóttir Reykjavík City Library

External links
Vilborg Dagbjartsdóttir Selected works with English translations

Dagbjartsdottir, Vilborg
Dagbjartsdottir, Vilborg

Icelandic women poets
Icelandic feminists
Icelandic socialists
Icelandic communists
20th-century Icelandic poets
20th-century Icelandic women writers